Martina Kohlová (born 16 November 1984) is a Slovak sprint canoer who has competed since the late 2000s. She won three medals in the K-2 200 m event at the ICF Canoe Sprint World Championships with a silver in 2007 and two bronzes (2009, 2010).

Koholová was eliminated in the semifinals of the K-2 500 m event at the 2008 Summer Olympics in Beijing and at the 2012 Summer Olympics in London.

References

External links
 
 
 

1984 births
Canoeists at the 2008 Summer Olympics
Canoeists at the 2012 Summer Olympics
Canoeists at the 2016 Summer Olympics
Living people
Olympic canoeists of Slovakia
Slovak female canoeists
ICF Canoe Sprint World Championships medalists in kayak
Canoeists at the 2015 European Games
European Games competitors for Slovakia